Chavalit Vidthayanon (born 1959 in Bangkok) is a Thai ichthyologist and senior researcher of biodiversity of WWF Thailand. He graduated from Bangkok Christian College and graduated in marine biology from Kasetsart University and Chulalongkorn University. Vidthayanon received a Ph.D. in fishery biology from the Tokyo Fisheries University (now's Tokyo University of Marine Science and Technology), Japan.

He has been working on aquatic biodiversity studies in Southeast Asia since 1983. He has worked with leading ichthyologists both Thais and foreigners such as Kittipong Jaruthanin, T. R. Roberts, H. H. Ng and Maurice Kottelat etc. He has studied and taxonomy many of the newly discovered freshwater species in the world (many were found in Mekong Basin) such as Amblypharyngodon chulabhornae, Himantura kittipongi, Pangasius conchophilus, P. myanmar, Pao  palustris, Pseudeutropius indigens, Schistura pridii etc. He specializing in Thai freshwater catfishes.

In addition, he is also an instructor on zoology and ichthyology at several educational institutions in Thailand such as Chulalongkorn University, Kasetsart University or Mahasarakham University etc.

See also
:Category:Taxa named by Chavalit Vidthayanon

References

External links

Living people
Taxon authorities
Ichthyologists
Chavalit Vidthayanon
1959 births
Chavalit Vidthayanon